The 1905 Oregon Webfoots football team represented the University of Oregon in the 1905 college football season. It was the Webfoots' 12th season; they competed as an independent and were led by head coach Bruce Shorts. They finished the season with a record of four wins, two losses and two ties (4–2–2).

Schedule

References

Oregon
Oregon Ducks football seasons
Oregon Webfoots football